LIVE (1984) is an ambient music album by the Robert Rich. This is the first live album recorded by Rich.

This is the only solo album by Rich to be released on cassette only. Each release of this album features a clipping from Rich's own EEG chart.

Track listing
”Monterey, September 15, 1983” – 43:00
”Stanford, March 13, 1984” – 45:00

See also
Robert Rich
Ambient music

Robert Rich (musician) albums
1984 live albums